Marinobacter nitratireducens is a Gram-negative, halophilic rod-shaped and motile bacterium from the genus of Marinobacter which has been isolated from coastal sea water from Visakhapatnam in India.

References 

Alteromonadales
Bacteria described in 2015
Halophiles